Palmas del Mar is a beach resort community consisting of a country club, golf courses, tennis, a beach club, residences and a hotel. It is located in the municipality of Humacao, Puerto Rico, on the southeast corner of the island.

Features

Palmas del Mar residential community has a bank, retail shops, The Palmas Academy, a private school, an equestrian center; two golf courses, 20 tennis courts, 16 restaurants, a country club with spa, a beach club, security with strict-access control 24 hours a day and a full-service marina and yacht club. Several properties within Palmas del Mar were purchased in 2014 by Encanto Group.

Doral Resort and Candelero Beach Resort are also located in Palmas del Mar. 

The school inside the resort is called The Palmas Academy. It was founded in 1992 by a group of parents and educators. The Academy is a coeducational, nonsectarian institution with English as the language of instruction and an excellent Spanish curriculum. The campus has  of land surrounded by a natural setting. The Academy has access to many of the facilities within Palmas del Mar. Sports, such as soccer, volleyball, golf, cross country, basketball, tennis, track and field, and swimming are part of the curriculum. In addition, the school has several clubs, such as The Drama Club, The Debate Club, The Environmental Club, The Living Green Team, El Club de Oratoria, Advanced Art, The Student Council, among others.

The Palmas del Mar Tropical Forest is a conservation easement located within and near Palmas del Mar.

In popular culture
A large portion of the Puerto Rican boy band Menudo's second feature film, Una Aventura Llamada Menudo (1982), was filmed at Palmas del Mar.

Gallery

See also

 List of beaches in Puerto Rico

References

Resorts in Puerto Rico
Beaches of Puerto Rico
Humacao, Puerto Rico